BAFWEEK (abbreviation for Buenos Aires Fashion Week, also stylized as BAFWeek) is a biannual clothing trade show held mainly in La Rural fairgrounds, Buenos Aires. Argentina's most important fashion event, BAFWEEK showcases both leading brands and emerging designers. In addition, the Semillero UBA BAFWEEK competition is held, where fashion design students from the University of Buenos Aires (UBA) are chosen by a panel of experts to present their collections at the event with financial support from Paseo Alcorta.

See also

 Fashion week
 Fashion capital
 São Paulo Fashion Week
 Rio Fashion Week

References

External links
 BAFWEEK official site

Fashion events in Argentina
Recurring events established in 2001
Events in Buenos Aires
Argentine fashion
Fashion weeks